"Mind on It" is a song by Yungen featuring vocals from British singer Jess Glynne. It was released as a digital download on 16 March 2018. The song peaked at number 47 on the UK Singles Chart.

Background
Talking to the Official Charts Company, Yungen said: "Every track I've done with a feature before has been with a male artist, so I knew that when I did one with a female, it had to be someone I was genuinely a fan of, someone who I think, woah, I can't believe I've got you on this track. I let my team reach out instead of me, because if she [Jess Glynne] said no to them and not me, it wouldn't hurt as much [laughs]. But she was up for it. Then we got in the studio and she is such a cool girl to work with - she's in this for the music."

Track listing

Charts

References

2018 songs
2018 singles
Jess Glynne songs